Chalcolyne  is a species of beetle in the family Cerambycidae, and the only species in the genus Chalcolyne. It was described by Pascoe in 1858.

References

Calliini
Beetles described in 1858
Monotypic Cerambycidae genera